Balham Lake is a small lake near the center of Balham Valley in Victoria Land. It was named in 1964 by American geologist Parker E. Calkin for its location in Balham Valley.

References
 

Lakes of Victoria Land
Scott Coast